Project 621 was a project by the Dornier company with the intention of producing a sounding rocket with liquid-fuel propulsion. It was to use a paraglider system to return safely to earth for later re-use. The paraglider system was tested in 1965, but the rocket itself was never launched.

The rocket of the project was supposed to reach a ceiling of eighty kilometers, and then return from a height of forty kilometers, spiraling to the ground. In 1965, a release-test on the rocket test area in Salto di Quirra was performed.

The project was halted in 1969, after large problems occurred regarding the choice of a suitable wing material (textile wings could not handle the loads, while wings made of high-grade steel could not withstand the airflow without major problems).

References
 astronautix.com

Sounding rockets of Germany